Dead Lucky is a 1960 British crime film directed by Montgomery Tully and starring Vincent Ball, Betty McDowall, John Le Mesurier, Alfred Burke and Michael Ripper. A crime reporter teams up with a fashion journalist to investigate illegal goings-on at a Mayfair gambling club. The film was produced by Robert Dunbar for Act Films Ltd.

Cast
 Vincent Ball as Mike Billings
 Betty McDowall as Jenny Drew
 John Le Mesurier as Inspector Corcoran
 Alfred Burke as Knocker Parsons
 Michael Ripper as Percy Simpson
 Sam Kydd as Harry Winston
 Chili Bouchier as Mrs Winston
 John Charlesworth as Honorable Stanley Dewsbury
 Frederick Piper as Harvey Walters

References

External links

1960 films
1960 crime films
British crime films
Films directed by Montgomery Tully
Films set in London
1960s English-language films
1960s British films